Antonio Gozzi is an Italian entrepreneur and he is the CEO of Duferco steel manufacturing company. He is also the actual chairman of the Italian soccer team Virtus Entella.

Arrest
He was arrested on 17 March 2015 for suspicion bribery business in Congo. He was later released; he said that he would resign from Italian Federacciai association in order to follow the ethical conduct of Federacciai association, but it was reconfirmed a few days later by the association.

References

Living people
1954 births